Garbers is a surname. Notable people with the surname include:

 Chris Garbers (born 1929), South African scientist
 David Garbers (1944–2006), American biologist
 Emelie Garbers (born 1982), Swedish actress
 Kate Garbers (born 1981), British activist

See also
 Garber (surname)